Sentinel Peak is a  peak in the Tucson Mountains southwest of downtown Tucson, Arizona, United States. The valley's first inhabitants grew crops at the mountain's base, along the Santa Cruz River. The name "Tucson" is derived from the O'odham , meaning "[at the] base of the black [hill]". The peak is part of a 272-acre (110 hectares) park, the largest natural resource park in the City of Tucson.

Early history

The fertile land at the base of Sentinel Peak was used for agriculture from  until the 1930s.  Bedrock mortars found on the sides of the peak are believed to have been used to grind corn and mesquite beans into flour.  In the 1690s, the O'odham people living in the area were visited by Eusebio Francisco Kino, who established the nearby Mission San Xavier del Bac.  After Presidio San Agustín del Tucsón was constructed in 1775, sentinels were stationed on the peak to watch for raiding Apaches.

Geology
Sentinel Peak is made up of several layers of igneous rock representing various types of volcanic activity, though the mountain itself is not a volcano.  It is one of a cluster of outcroppings at the eastern edge of the Tucson Mountains that are primarily the remnants of 20–30 million-year-old (Ma) lava flows that once extended west towards the Tucson Mountains and east into the Tucson Basin, where the city is now. Erosion and faulting are responsible for the peak's conical shape.

The layer of rock at the peak of the hill is a basaltic andesite dating to 23–24 Ma.  This caps a -thick layer of tuff (compacted volcanic ash) above another layer of basaltic andesite, both dating to 26–28 Ma.  Tuffs and andesite exposed at the base of the hill, on the south side, date to approximately 60 Ma.

Volcanic ash and breccia, along with ancient lava beds, or lahars, can also be found on the mountain, further evidence of a once active volcanic field that formed the Tucson Mountain range.

Etymology
On October 3, 2016, in the Arizona Daily Star'' newspaper, historian David Leighton explained the origin of the name Sentinel Peak:

He wrote that in the very early days of Tucson, an Indian fortification was constructed at the top of a small mountain that would come to be called Sentinel Peak – also sometimes referred to as Picket Post Butte. This Indian fortification in time became known as the sentinel station because a sentinel or guard was posted there to watch for approaching enemies, likely Apache Indians. During the U.S. Civil War, armed guards or soldiers were posted at the sentinel station and a canvas was stretched across the stone fortification, to keep the sun from hitting directly on the men posted there.

By 1883, only ruins of the fortification remained. The remains included, "A circular wall, about 3 feet thick and made of boulders, [that] enclosed an area about 8 feet in diameter. North of the circular structure was a small wall, roughly two feet high and about 10 feet long. To the east were traces of another, smaller circular wall."

In 1925, the remains of the fortifications still existed at the top of what by then was being called "A" Mountain, although it is unknown what exactly was left at that point.

The origin of the name Sentinel Peak, according to Leighton, "comes from the sentinel station and the sentinel stationed there."

The "A"
After Arizona Wildcats football's 7–6 victory over Pomona College in 1914, a civil engineering student on the team convinced one of his professors to make a class project of the survey and design for a huge block "A" on Sentinel Peak. The basalt rock used in the construction of the "A" was hauled from a quarry at the mountain's base, which supplied stone for many foundations and walls throughout Tucson, including the wall surrounding the University of Arizona campus.

The "A" has traditionally been painted white.  On March 23, 2003, four days after the start of the Iraq War, it was painted black in protest.  Two weeks later, following much public debate, the Tucson City Council resolved to have the "A" painted red, white, and blue in honor of American troops.  A decade later, the council decided to restore it to its traditional white.  The "A" has on occasion been painted green for St. Patrick's Day. On May 8, 2020, it was painted blue to honor local healthcare workers during the COVID-19 pandemic.

Arizona State University (ASU) has a more recently created "A" Mountain (Tempe Butte) near the school's football stadium.  During the week of the Arizona – ASU Territorial Cup game, rival fans and students have tried and at times succeeded in painting the "A" of the opposing school with their own school colors.

Gallery

See also

 List of mountains and hills of Arizona by height
 University of Arizona
 List of hillside letters in Arizona
 Y Mountain

References

Mountains of Arizona
Geography of Tucson, Arizona
University of Arizona
Geoglyphs
Landforms of Pima County, Arizona
Landmarks in Tucson, Arizona
Hill figures in the United States
Mountains of Pima County, Arizona